Maathangal Ezhu is a 1993 Indian Tamil-language drama film directed by Yugi Sethu. He also stars, alongside Ramya Krishnan and Nassar. The film was released on 9 July 1993.

Plot

Cast 
 Yugi Sethu as Raja
 Ramya Krishnan as Savitri
 Nassar as Raghu
 Charuhasan as the doctor

Production 
Maathangal Ezhu was the second directorial film of Yugi Sethu after Kavithai Paada Neramillai (1987). It was produced under Vivek Chithra Productions.

Soundtrack 
The soundtrack was composed by Vidyasagar, with lyrics by Vaali.

Release and reception 
Although Maathangal Ezhu was cleared by the Censor Board in 1991, it was released only on 9 July 1993. Malini Mannath of The Indian Express wrote, "The attempt to make a film that is artistic as well as commercial backfires". R. P. R. of Kalki, however, reviewed the film more positively, comparing it favourably to older Tamil films. The film was not commercially successful.

References

External links 
 

1990s Tamil-language films
1993 drama films
Films scored by Vidyasagar
Indian drama films